80 Million Women Want—? (alternate title: What 80 Million Women Want) is a 1913 American silent melodrama film. It was produced by Unique Film Co. in partnership with the Women's Political Union. The film featured cameos by prominent suffragists, including Emmeline Pankhurst and Harriot Stanton Blatch.

Plot

See also 
 Women's suffrage in film

References

External links 
 
 

1913 films
American silent feature films
1910s American films